Estay Rock is a rock lying  west-southwest of Toro Point, Trinity Peninsula, Antarctica. It was named for a minister of the Chilean government, Fidel Estay Cortez, and the name appears on a Chilean government chart of 1948.

References 

Rock formations of the Trinity Peninsula